is a 1980 Japanese punk-action-biker film written and directed by Gakuryū Ishii. Ishii made the film as his graduation project whilst studying at Nihon University and was subsequently distributed by Toei Studios.

Cast
Tatsuo Yamada as Jin
Hiroshi Kaiya as Tadashi
Masamitsu Daichi as Yukio
Yōsuke Nakajima as Eiji
Tadashi Kamiya as Kume
Akihiro Kimura as Ujioka
Hiroyuki Kiyosue as Nakamura
Katsunori Hirose as Koguma
Masahiro Ōzeki as Terayama
Nenji Kobayashi as Tsuyoshi
Masashi Kojima as Shigeru
Koji Nanjō as Ken
Michiko Kitahara as Noriko
Naoto Ōmori as Kotarō
Masahiro Yoshiwara as Ossan
Akemi Morimura as Jin's girlfriend

References

External links 
 

1980 films
1980 action films
Outlaw biker films
1980s Japanese films